The Anglican Church of India (ACI) is a union of independent Anglican churches in India. It is not currently a member of the worldwide Anglican Communion whose titular leader is the Archbishop of Canterbury.

In 1947, the Church of South India (CSI) was formed in newly independent India as a united church of Anglicans, Baptists, Basel Mission, Lutherans and Presbyterians.  The Church of South India accepted an order of uniformity in worship and practice which was at odds with some aspects of Anglican tradition. Traditional Anglicans in the CSI did not accept this and there was a provision for separation within a period of 30 years from the CSI.  Therefore, in 1964, some Anglicans decided to withdraw from the CSI and re-established the Anglican Church of India on 24 August 1964.

V.J. Stephen was consecrated as a bishop by Anglican bishops from the United States and Africa and also by an "Anglicanised" Evangelical bishop from Kerala, India, on 5 May 1966.

Even though the church was re-established in 1964, the synod of the Anglican Church of India was only formed in 1990 at Kottayam. The synod consists of all the diocesan bishops, clergy secretaries, lay leaders of the dioceses and church-related organisations and representatives of each diocese and independent churches. Independent churches function where there are not enough congregations to form a diocese and are also given representation in the synod.  Archbishop Stephen Vattappara serves as the chairman of the synod and also as the Metropolitan of the Anglican Church of India.

Faith
The foundation of the ACI's faith is contained in what is known as the Lambeth Quadrilateral accepted by the Church of England in 1888 which states:

 Accepting the Holy Bible as the ultimate source of divine truth
 Acceptance of the Apostles and Nicene Creeds
 Acceptance of the only two sacraments ordained by Jesus Christ, Holy Baptism and Holy Eucharist
 Acceptance of the historic episcopal succession

Biblical beliefs
Among other equally important biblical beliefs, ACI accepts:

 the divine inspiration of the scriptures
 the Holy Trinity
 the virginity of Mary, Mother of Jesus
 the redemption of sinners through Christ
 the resurrection of Christ and
 the everlasting bliss of the saved

 The head of the Anglican Church of India [Church of England in India] was the Bishop of Calcutta. His title was metropolitan. In 1947 this ceased to exist as the mainstream of Anglican Churches joined the Church Unions of South and North India [the present CSI and CNI]. They call their heads moderators. But when the ACI formed its synod in 1990 it decided to bring back the title of metropolitan.

Metropolitan 
Bp. Stephen Vattappara began his public life as a college students' union chairman in Kottayam.  He served as a telecommunication engineer in Bombay and Northern India.  He resigned his job and entered the ordained ministry in 1971. He was consecrated as bishop of the Diocese of Travancore and Cochin in 1982 and became the adjutor bishop in 1987.  He was selected as the first metropolitan of the Anglican Church of India in 1990 and serves also as a vice president of the International Council of Christian Churches (ICCC).  In Christianity banned Libya, while visiting his wife in 1987, Vattappara formed the Interdenominational Christian Fellowship which still remains as the only Christian movement in that country.  Vattappara served as the editor of Malayalam Christian publications such as Griha Deepam and 'Christian Beacon.  He has written and published several books, including He that guides in to All Truth, Gathereth not with Jesus, Scattereth, The End is not at once, Lo Here or There, My Kingdom is not of this World, The Anglican Church History, Baptist – A type of Antichrist? and A Complete Study on Baptism''.

Dioceses
The Anglican Church of India consists of different dioceses, independent churches and other organizations. The Diocese of Travancore and Cochin is now elevated to the status of an archdiocese. The ACI currently has 15 dioceses and several independent churches as members of the synod. Out of the 15 dioceses, five are under the jurisdiction of the Archdiocese of Travancore and Cochin. The ACI is growing rapidly and is influencing many believers to come and join their fellow Anglican believers.

References

Anglicanism in India
Continuing Anglican denominations
Christian organizations established in 1964
Anglican denominations established in the 20th century